Live at McCabe's is a live album released by singer-songwriter Townes Van Zandt in 1995. It was recorded at McCabe's Guitar Shop in Santa Monica, California and is a limited edition. Only 2000 copies were printed.

Van Zandt is joined on stage by slide guitarist Kelly Joe Phelps.

Track listing 
All songs written by Townes Van Zandt unless otherwise noted.
 "The Hole" – 6:43
 "Pueblo Waltz" – 3:41
 "Pancho and Lefty" – 5:32
 "Short Haired Woman Blues" (Lightnin' Hopkins) – 7:49
 "Shrimp Song" (Roy C. Bennett, Sid Tepper) – 4:14
 "Snowin' on Raton" – 7:20
 "Katie Belle" – 3:20
 "Dollar Bill Blues" – 3:37
 "A Song For" – 5:30
 "Banks of the Ohio" (Traditional) – 5:25
 "Wabash Cannonball" (Traditional) – 4:47
 "Marie" – 5:45

Personnel
Townes Van Zandt – vocals, guitar
Kelly Joe Phelps – dobro

Production notes
Produced by Townes Van Zandt
Harold F. Eggers Jr. – executive producer
Olaf Meyer – artwork

References

Townes Van Zandt albums
2001 live albums